Albizia guillainii is a species of plant in the family Fabaceae. It is found only in New Caledonia. It is threatened by habitat loss.

References

guillainii
Endemic flora of New Caledonia
Critically endangered plants
Trees of the Pacific
Taxonomy articles created by Polbot